Grannys Branch is a stream in McDonald County in the U.S. state of Missouri.

Grannys Branch was named after an unidentified elderly person.

See also
List of rivers of Missouri

References

Rivers of McDonald County, Missouri
Rivers of Missouri